Andres Sutt (born 11 November 1967) is an Estonian politician. He served as Minister of Entrepreneurship and Information Technology in the cabinet of Prime Minister Kaja Kallas. He served as acting Minister of Foreign Affairs from June to July 2022.

Early life and education
Sutt graduated cum laude from the University of Tartu in 1993 with a degree in economics and finance. In 2008, he graduated from the Advanced Management Program from INSEAD, and in 2015 with a degree in Negotiations and Leadership from Harvard Law School.

Career
From 1992 to 1993, Sutt was the Chief Specialist of Eesti Pank's Central Bank Policy Department. From 1993 to 1996, the Deputy Head of the Banking Supervision Department, and from 1997 to 1999 Deputy Head of the Central Bank Policy Department. From 1999 until 2001, he was the Adviser to the Executive Director of the International Monetary Fund’s (IMF) Nordic-Baltic Constituency and Member of the Board of Directors from 2009 until 2012.

Sutt was Senior Adviser to the Executive Director of the European Financial Stability Facility (EFSF) from 2012 to 2013 and Head of the Banking Division of the European Stability Mechanism (ESM) from 2013 to 2016. From 2017 to 2018, he worked as the Director of Regulatory Relations of Eesti Energia and as a member of the Management Board of the company.

In his capacity as interim foreign minister, Sutt summoned the Russian ambassador to Estonia in June 2022 to condemn President Vladimir Putin's "completely unacceptable" praise for Peter the Great who captured Narva, a city that is now Estonian.

Recognition
In 2008, Sutt was awarded the Order of the White Star, Class III.

References 

Living people
1967 births
Politicians from Tartu
Government ministers of Estonia
Estonian Reform Party politicians
21st-century Estonian politicians
Members of the Riigikogu, 2019–2023
Members of the Riigikogu, 2023–2027
University of Tartu alumni
Harvard Law School alumni
Recipients of the Order of the White Star, 3rd Class